Blue Jeans is a 1917 American silent drama film, based on the 1890 play Blue Jeans by Joseph Arthur that opened in New York City to great popularity. The sensation of the play was a dramatic scene where the unconscious hero is placed on a board approaching a huge buzz saw in a sawmill, later imitated to the point of cliché.

Prints survive at several archives including the George Eastman House Motion Picture Collection.

Cast
 Viola Dana as June
 Robert D. Walker as Perry Bascom
 Sally Crute as Sue Eudaly
 Clifford Bruce as Ben Boone
 Henry Hallam as Colonel Henry Clay Risener
 Russell Simpson as Jacob Tutwiler
 Margaret McWade as Cindy Tutwiler
 Augustus Phillips as Jack Bascom

Reception
Like many American films of the time, Blue Jeans was subject to cuts by city and state film censorship boards. For example, the Chicago Board of Censors required a cut of the intertitle "You have transgressed the moral law" etc., the starting of the saw and the laying of the man on the block before it, and three scenes of the man in front of the saw.

References

External links
 
 Lantern slide

1917 films
American silent feature films
American black-and-white films
1917 drama films
Silent American drama films
Films directed by John H. Collins
1910s American films